Cecil Holden Patterson (1912 – 2006) was an American psychologist. He was an Emeritus Professor of Psychology at the University of Illinois at Urbana-Champaign in the United States. He worked directly with Carl Rogers and practiced person-centered (Rogerian) therapy throughout his career.

Patterson was born June 22, 1912 in Lynn, Massachusetts. He received his bachelor's degree in Sociology from the University of Chicago in 1938, and his Ph.D. in Psychology from the University of Minnesota in 1955. He was the author of many publications in the fields of educational psychology and counseling.

He served in the Army during World War II.  In 1942, he married Frances Spano, a nutritionist whom he met at Fels Research Institute in Yellow Springs, Ohio. They had seven children.  His second-eldest child is Francine Patterson, a researcher who taught a modified form of American Sign Language to a gorilla named Koko.  He also loved good food and retired in the Asheville, NC area in later life where he established a well loved restaurant.

Patterson's publications used in counselor education include Theories of Counseling and Psychotherapy and The Therapeutic Relationship: Foundations for an Eclectic Psychotherapy.

He died May 26, 2006.

External links

1912 births
2006 deaths
United States Army personnel of World War II
University of Minnesota College of Liberal Arts alumni
20th-century American psychologists
People from Yellow Springs, Ohio
University of Chicago alumni
University of Illinois Urbana-Champaign faculty